Umag is a coastal town in Istria, Croatia.

Geography
It is the westernmost town of Croatia, and it includes Bašanija, the westernmost point of Croatia.

Population
Umag has a population of 7,281, with a total municipal population of 13,467 (2011 census). Like many other towns in Istria, Umag has a multi-ethnic population. Croats, because of the exodus of many Italians after the Second World War, are nowadays an absolute majority with 59.6%; Italians 18.3%, Serbs 3.8%, Slovenes 2.2%, Bosniaks 1.7%, Albanians 1.3% and those regionally declared (as Istrians) make up the final 1.57%.
However, according to the 1921 census, 100% of the population spoke Italian.

Settlements 
The list of settlements in the Municipality of Umag.
Babići / Babici
Bašanija / Bassania
Crveni Vrh / Monterosso
Čepljani / Ceppiani
Đuba / Giubba
Finida / Finida
Juricani / Giurizzani
Katoro / Cattoro
Kmeti / Metti
Križine / Cresine
Lovrečica / San Lorenzo
Materada / Matterada
Monterol / Monterol
Murine / Morino
Petrovija / Petrovia
Savudrija / Salvore
Seget / Seghetto
Sveta Marija na Krasu / Madonna del Carso
Umag / Umago
Valica / Valizza
Vardica / Vardizza
Vilanija / Villania
Zambratija / Zambrattia

History

Umag was mentioned for the first time in the 7th century by an anonymous citizen from Ravenna, but it already existed in Roman times. Proof of this is found in the numerous remains of Roman villas, the so-called villa rustica uncovered all along the coast. The town's history is closely linked to the settlement of Sipar, whose ruins can be found on a narrow cape four kilometres north of Umag. In the 9th century, the fortified settlement of Sipar was devastated by invaders, the Neretva pirates. However, after this unfortunate incident Umag grew in significance thanks also to its location, a small islet separated from the mainland by a narrow channel. It was actually this location that safeguarded the settlement from the continuous invasions down through the centuries. The Roman period of relative prosperity was interspersed with one of insecurity caused primarily by frequent invasions, outbreaks of plague, cholera, and malaria. The number of its inhabitants declined rapidly. Umag became part of the reigns of Odoacer, Theodoric, and was also ruled by the Langobards.

From the 6th to the 8th centuries it fell under Byzantine dominion, followed by the rule of the Lombards in 751 and Francs in 774. The subsequent period was marked by insecurity and frequent changes of government ranging from the Patriarchs of Grado and Aquileia to the Bishops of Trieste. However, the increasingly powerful Venetian Republic imposed its rule over Istria, forcing Umag and other western Istrian towns to swear loyalty to Venice. In fact, in 1269, the Commune of Umag swore loyalty to Venice which from that time on 1797 was to appoint governors of Umag from among its nobility. This period was by no means a peaceful one.

Century-old clashes with Genoa brought about more destruction and looting. In 1370 the Genoese navy attacked Umag, destroying the town's archive. The outbreaks of plague that decimated the inhabitants forced the Venetian authorities to consider colonising the area with new settlers, mainly from the territories threatened by Turkish invasions. The harbour of Umag was utilised for loading agricultural surplus from the hinterland. Up to the collapse of Venice Umag had lived like other Istrian towns. Its communal arrangement was guaranteed by Statute from 1541.

With the fall of the Venetian Republic, Umag, like the entire eastern Adriatic coast, came under the rule of France until 1815 when it passed over to Austria until 1918. With the end of World War I Istria became part of Italy. After World War II, the flaring up of the Trieste crises resulted in the establishment of the Free Territory of Trieste, while Umag became part of Zone B governed by the Yugoslav Army, and eventually became part of SR Croatia within SFR Yugoslavia in 1954. After Umag became part of Yugoslavia, there was an exodus of many Italians from the town, who, until then, had constituted the majority of its population.

In 1993, with the establishment of the new local rule, Umag became an independent municipality, and, in 1997, was awarded the status of town (grad).

Economy

The natural features of the area have considerably influenced the development of the economy as a whole. The geographical location of Umag, in particular, has ensured an intensive and dynamic growth of the tourist industry after World War II, which has been expanding rapidly ever since. The closeness of big west European markets and the rise in standard of East European countries have both accounted for the expansion of this economic branch which is tightly linked to other economic resources in the region the most significant being agriculture. The best fertile soil and the vast arable land in the area have fostered the production of traditional Mediterranean crops present in the region for thousands of years, with particular emphasis on olive growing and wine grape growing.

The latter accounts for a successful winemaking industry and the emerging in recent years of a number of highly renowned local wine makers that can be traced in the wine chart of Istria. Linked with agriculture is the rapidly expanding tourist branch agro-tourism which has not only enriched the tourist offer but is also committed to preserving the old-world values of the region. Apart from that, mention must be made of the "Podravka" food factory in Umag where huge quantities of tomatoes are processed. In fact, the food industry started in Umag in the early 20th century with the opening of the "Arrigoni" plant for packing fish and tomatoes and the building of a flour mill, the predecessor of today's bakery and biscuit factory.

Today new factories have grown up in two industrial zones (Ungarija and Kravlji rt), which are provided with the necessary infrastructure continuously rebuilt and enlarged. The economic growth of Umag is based on the stimulation and support of small and medium-sized firms and the establishment of business zones. For that purpose, the town authorities have set apart 355,200.00 kuna for the programme aimed at stimulating the growth of agriculture and businesses for the year 2002. Besides, Umag is the founding member of the "Istarska razvojna agencija" IDA (Istrian Development Agency), with its seat in Pula.

Events
Umag hosts Sea Star Festival every May since 2017

The town hosts an annual ATP tennis tournament on clay courts.

References

External links 

 
 Umag official site
 Official Tourist Board Umag
Map of Umag
First portal of Umag

Cities and towns in Croatia
Populated coastal places in Croatia
Populated places in Istria County
Italian-speaking territorial units in Croatia